"Pour être libre" may refer to:

 Pour être libre (album), a 2005 studio album by French singer Lââm
 "Pour être libre" (Lââm song), the title track from the album
 "Pour être libre", a 1997 song the by French band 2Be3